Alex Benjamin Barron (born September 28, 1982) is a former American football offensive tackle in the National Football League for the St. Louis Rams, Dallas Cowboys and New Orleans Saints. He was drafted by the St. Louis Rams with the 19th overall pick of the 2005 NFL Draft. He played college football for Florida State University, and was a two-time consensus All-American.

Early years
Barron was born in Orangeburg, South Carolina.  He attended Orangeburg-Wilkinson High School, and was a two-sport standout in football and basketball for the O-W Bruins. 

In football, he was named a high school All-American by both PrepStar and Football News, ranked the No. 3 lineman in the nation by PrepStar, named to the All-South team by the Orlando Sentinel, and selected as Jeff Whittaker's Deep South Recruiting Guide South Carolina Player of the Year.

College career
Barron accepted a football scholarship from Florida State University, where he played for coach Bobby Bowden's Florida State Seminoles football team from 2001 to 2004. As a redshirt freshman, he played in 4 games as a backup. As a sophomore, he appeared in 14 with five starts. As a junior, he started 12 games. 

As a senior, he started all 13 games, allowing only five quarterback pressures and one sack, while contributing to the Seminoles gaining 4,470 offensive yards. He was also one of three finalists for the Outland Trophy.  

Barron started 30 out of 43 career games at left tackle. He was a first-team All-Atlantic Coast Conference (ACC) selection in 2003 and 2004, and was recognized as a consensus first-team All-American in 2003 and a unanimous first-team All-American in 2004. He graduated from Florida State with a bachelor's degree in social science.

In 2016, he was inducted into the Florida State University Athletics Hall of Fame. He also has a permanent display in the Seminoles' locker room.

Professional career

Pre-draft measurables

St. Louis Rams
Barron was selected by the St. Louis Rams in the 1st round (19th overall) of the 2005 NFL Draft. On August 14, 2005, he signed a five-year, $9.2 million contract with the Rams with escalators that could take the value to over $11 million. The contract featured $5.5 million in guaranteed money, not including the signing bonus of $1 million. As a rookie, he was moved to right tackle, because the team had All-Pro Orlando Pace starting at left tackle. Barron passed Rex Tucker on the depth chart, starting 11 games, while making his pro debut against the Tennessee Titans and his first start against the New York Giants.

In 2007, he started 16 games at right tackle. He switched from right to left tackle against the San Francisco 49ers, after Pace was injured in Week 1.

In 2008, he started 15 of 16 games at right tackle, while contributing to running back Steven Jackson leading the league with an average of 118.4 yards from scrimmage. He was a part of an offensive line that allowed 45 sacks, the fewest by the Rams since 2003.

In 2009, he started 16 games at left tackle after Pace was released. He allowed 7 sacks and led the league with 7 holding penalties. In a 35–0 loss against the San Francisco 49ers, his poor play resulted on him being benched for the rest of the game, after getting an illegal formation penalty for lining up in the backfield. He contributed to Jackson rushing for more than 1,400 yards (most in the NFC).

In 2010, the Rams drafted offensive tackle Rodger Saffold to compete with Barron. On May 10, he was traded to the Dallas Cowboys, in exchange for another underwhelming former first round draft choice in linebacker Bobby Carpenter.

Barron had a disappointing career with the Rams, becoming notorious for his inconsistency, false starts and holding penalties. Although he was durable, starting 74 games at both left and right tackle, he struggled with penalties and poor blocking. He committed 43 false start penalties (13 in 2006), 13 holding penalties and allowed 33 sacks. Such poor play after having been a first round draft has led to him being labeled as a bust among Ram fans.

Dallas Cowboys

In 2010, he was acquired to provide depth and compete with Doug Free for the left tackle position, after the release of Flozell Adams. He got off to an inauspicious beginning, in his first game and start at right tackle in place of an injured Marc Colombo, the Cowboys appeared to have come back from a 13–7 deficit on a touchdown pass from Tony Romo to Roy Williams on the final play against the Washington Redskins on the season opener. However, Barron was flagged for holding defensive end Brian Orakpo and because the penalty was called against the offense, the game was over with the Cowboys losing. Although he was active for 10 additional games, he would not play another down and was not re-signed at the end of the year.

New Orleans Saints
On August 3, 2011, Barron signed with the New Orleans Saints. On August 18, he was put on the injured reserve list. He was waived with an injury settlement on October 22.

Seattle Seahawks
On May 15, 2012, he signed as a free agent with the Seattle Seahawks, after having a tryout with the team during rookie minicamp. He was cut on August 26.

Oakland Raiders
On March 26, 2013, Barron signed with the Oakland Raiders, to provide depth after starter Jared Veldheer suffered a torn left triceps. On September 2, he was released to make room on the roster for offensive tackle Tony Pashos.

References

External links
 Florida State profile

1982 births
Living people
American football offensive tackles
Dallas Cowboys players
Florida State Seminoles football players
New Orleans Saints players
Oakland Raiders players
Seattle Seahawks players
St. Louis Rams players
All-American college football players
People from Orangeburg, South Carolina
Players of American football from South Carolina
Orangeburg-Wilkinson High School alumni